Pennsylvania English or Pennsylvania dialects may refer to:

Inland Northern American English, spoken in northeastern Pennsylvania
Pennsylvania Dutch English, spoken in southeastern Pennsylvania by some of the Pennsylvania Dutch community
Philadelphia English, spoken in southeastern Pennsylvania
Western Pennsylvania English, spoken in western and central Pennsylvania, including Pittsburgh